Niels Mikkelsen (19 March 1902 – 14 September 1964) was a Danish equestrian. He competed in the individual and team three-day events at the 1948 Summer Olympics, and failed to finish.

Mikkelsen held a rank of captain. He retired from military service in 1955, and later worked at the Circus Benneweis and the Hjortekær riding school.

References

External links
 

1902 births
1964 deaths
Danish male equestrians
Olympic equestrians of Denmark
Equestrians at the 1948 Summer Olympics